Santiago "Jimmy" Heriberto Mellado (born April 6, 1963), is the President and CEO of Compassion International, a Christian holistic child development organization dedicated to the long-term development of children living in poverty around the world, which is based in Colorado Springs, Colorado. Mellado previously served as president of the Willow Creek Association (WCA) in South Barrington, Illinois, from 1993 to 2013. He also competed in the 1988 Summer Olympics and 1987 Pan American Games as a decathlete. He serves as a trustee for Fuller Theological Seminary and on the board of directors for the National Association of Evangelicals. He also serves on the Board of Directors for Art of the Olympians.

Education
Mellado graduated cum laude with a degree in Mechanical Engineering from Southern Methodist University in 1985. He later graduated from Harvard Business School in 1991. While he was at Harvard, he wrote a case study on the Willow Creek Community Church which has become a part of the curriculum at Harvard Business School.

Olympic Games
Mellado competed in the 1988 Summer Olympics in Seoul, South Korea, representing his birth nation, El Salvador, in the decathlon. He placed 26th of 42 athletes who qualified, and set six national records for the highest-ever performance in the decathlon, men's high jump, 400m, 110m high hurdles, pole vault, and javelin. The decathlon record still stands  years later.

Pan American Games

Mellado competed in the 1987 Pan American Games and placed fourth in the decathlon.

Compassion International
Mellado became the President and Chief Executive Officer (CEO) of Compassion International in 2013 when he replaced retiring CEO Wess Stafford.

Personal
He and his wife, Leanne, were married in 1986. They have three children, two sons-in-law, and four grandchildren.

References

1963 births
American evangelists
American nonprofit chief executives
American people of Salvadoran descent
Athletes (track and field) at the 1987 Pan American Games
Athletes (track and field) at the 1988 Summer Olympics
Harvard Business School alumni
Living people
Olympic athletes of El Salvador
Pan American Games competitors for El Salvador
Salvadoran decathletes
People from South Barrington, Illinois